Fossgate is a street in the city centre of York, in England.

History
The street is believed to follow the line of a Roman road leading south-east out of Eboracum.  Although it lay outside the Roman walls, it is known that there was a civilian settlement in the area.  There is no evidence of occupation in the Anglian period, but in Scandinavian Jorvik, it was fully built up, mostly for industrial and commercial uses.

The street was first mentioned in about 1130.  In the Medieval period, it fell within the parish of St Crux, and that church was sometimes regarded as lying on the street, although it was entered from Pavement.  In 1295, the York Carmelite Friary was built to the east of the street, and it was entered from a gateway near the Pavement end of Fossgate.  In 1357, the Merchant Adventurer's Hall was built, set back from the street.  Many of the boundaries between building plots also date from this period.

In 1590, a cattle market was established on the street, held every second Thursday, and from 1632, an annual cattle fair was also held.  By the 19th-century, it was being held further out of town.  In 1663, the St Crux Parish Almshouse was built on the street, but it was demolished in 1935.  Most of the buildings on the street were repeatedly reconstructed from the 17th- to the 19th-century, and the street was widened in 1812.  A brewery operated on the street.

By the 19th-century, Fossgate was regarded as one of the poorer streets in the city, and the York's Chartist Association Room was on Straker's Passage, just off the street.  A Methodist Sunday school was built in 1822, and the following year, it also became an infants' school, closing in 1853.

With the decline of trade along the River Foss in the 20th-century, Fossgate became less important.  It is currently lined with independent shops, pubs and restaurants.

Layout and architecture

The street runs south-east, from the junction of Pavement, Whip-Ma-Whop-Ma-Gate and Stonebow, to Foss Bridge over the River Foss.  Beyond the river, it continues as Walmgate.  Lady Peckett's Yard, a snickelway, runs off the south-west side of the street, while Straker's Passage and Franklin's Yard run off its north-east side.

Notable buildings on the north-east side include the 17th-century 8 Fossgate; the timber-framed 15 and 16 Fossgate, built about 1600; and the former Electric Cinema, the city's first purpose-built cinema.  On the south-west side lie 35 Fossgate, built in about 1815 as the King's Arms; the tiny Blue Bell pub; 55-56 Fossgate, built in 1796; and the 17th-century gatehouse to the Merchant Adventurer's Hall, with the hall itself hidden behind.

References

External links

 
Streets in York